David Dunlop Newsom (January 6, 1918 – March 30, 2008) was an American diplomat. He served as the United States Ambassador to Libya from 1965 to 1969, the United States Assistant Secretary of State for African Affairs from 1969 to 1974, the United States Ambassador to Indonesia from 1973 to 1977 and the United States Ambassador to the Philippines from 1977 to 1978.

In October 1979, when Mohammad Reza Pahlavi checked into the New York Hospital-Cornell Medical Center, he used "David D. Newsom" as his temporary codename without Newsom's knowledge.

Newsom served as Acting Secretary of State in May 1980, and held the same position in January, 1981.

Newsom was also the author of six books and a regular columnist for The Christian Science Monitor, contributing over 400 columns from 1981 to 2005.

On June 16, 2004, he joined a group of twenty-seven called Diplomats and Military Commanders for Change opposing the Iraq War.

Notes

References
Obituary in The Washington Post
Obituary in The New York Times

External links

1918 births
2008 deaths
Place of birth missing
Assistant Secretaries of State for African Affairs
Ambassadors of the United States to Indonesia
Ambassadors of the United States to the Philippines
Ambassadors of the United States to Libya
Under Secretaries of State for Political Affairs
United States Foreign Service personnel
Acting United States Secretaries of State
20th-century American diplomats
The Christian Science Monitor people